The ruddy spinetail (Synallaxis rutilans) is a species of bird in the family Furnariidae. It is found in Bolivia, Brazil, Colombia, Ecuador, French Guiana, Guyana, Peru, Suriname, and Venezuela. Its natural habitat is subtropical or tropical moist lowland forests.

References

ruddy spinetail
Birds of the Guianas
Birds of the Amazon Basin
ruddy spinetail
Birds of Brazil
Taxonomy articles created by Polbot